William Geoffrey Beattie (born 1960) is a Canadian business executive and former lawyer. He received his law degree from the University of Western Ontario in 1984 and served as a partner in the Toronto law firm Torys LLP before joining The Woodbridge Company, where he served as president from 1998 through December 2012.

The Woodbridge Company Limited is a privately held investment holding company for the Thomson family of Canada and the majority shareholder of Thomson Reuters, where Beattie served as deputy chairman from 2000 through May 2013 and director from 1998 through May 2013. He has served as chief executive officer of Generation Capital since September 2013, and he has served as chairman of Relay Ventures since June 2013. He also serves as a member of the board of directors of Royal Bank of Canada (where he serves as the chairman of the Risk Committee) and Maple Leaf Foods Inc. In addition to his public company board memberships, Beattie is a trustee of the University Health Network in Toronto.

He served as the chairman of CTVglobemedia from 2007 to 2011 and as the chairman of Maple Leaf Foods from 2019 to 2022.

References

External links 
 GE Capital Profile

21st-century Canadian businesspeople
Living people
Place of birth missing (living people)
University of Western Ontario alumni
20th-century Canadian businesspeople
Canadian business executives
Directors of Royal Bank of Canada
Canadian chairpersons of corporations
20th-century Canadian lawyers
Canadian chief executives
1960 births